Blind is the third studio album by American heavy metal band Corrosion of Conformity, released on November 5, 1991 via Relativity Records. The album saw the band change their crossover thrash sound of the 1980s to a more straightforward metal sound.

Blind was Corrosion of Conformity's first album in six years since the release of Animosity, and their first release with rhythm guitarist Pepper Keenan as well as their only recording with Karl Agell on vocals, and the only one on which original bassist Mike Dean does not appear. Phil Swisher instead took his place – his sole appearance on a C.O.C. album.

The album was re-released through Columbia Records in 1995, featuring three additional songs.

Reception

Blind received a positive review from AllMusic writer Eduardo Rivadavia, who gave the album four-and-a-half stars out of five, and stated, "By the time they released 1991's Blind, crossover pioneers Corrosion of Conformity were pursuing a decidedly metallic direction, but this in no way compromised their punk ethic, overtly political lyrical themes, and incredible sonic aggression." Rivadavia described "Damned for All Time" and "Mine Are the Eyes of God" as "excellent tracks" that "manage to be both utterly heavy and surprisingly catchy", while he describes "Dance of the Dead" and "Echoes in the Well" as "straightforward metal as C.O.C. gets." He also described Blind as "simply one of the most important heavy rock albums of the decade."

Blind was the album that broke Corrosion of Conformity into the heavy metal mainstream, peaking at number 24 on the Heatseekers chart. One of the singles, "Dance of the Dead", saw regular radio play on popular stations such as Los Angeles's KNAC. "Vote with a Bullet" was also released as a single.

Track listing

Personnel 
Corrosion of Conformity
 Karl Agell – lead vocals, saxophone on "Jim Beam and the Coon Ass"
 Woody Weatherman – lead guitar
 Pepper Keenan – rhythm guitar, backing vocals, lead vocals on "Vote with a Bullet" and "Jim Beam and the Coon Ass"
 Phil Swisher – bass
 Reed Mullin – drums, backing vocals, saxophone case on "Jim Beam and the Coon Ass"

Production
 Corrosion of Conformity – producer
 John Custer – producer, mixing, guitar on "Jim Beam and the Coon Ass"
 Steve McAllister – engineer, co-producer
 Garris Shipon – mixing
 Tony Dawsey – mastering

Artwork and photography
 Bill Sienkiewicz – artwork
 Danny Clinch – band photo
 David Bett – art direction

References

Corrosion of Conformity albums
1991 albums
Relativity Records albums